GNU IceCat, formerly known as GNU IceWeasel, is a completely free version of the Mozilla Firefox web browser distributed by the GNU Project. It is compatible with Linux, Windows, Android and macOS.

IceCat is released as a part of GNUzilla, GNU's rebranding of a code base that used to be the Mozilla Application Suite. As an internet suite, GNUzilla also includes a mail and newsgroup program, and an HTML composer.

Mozilla produces free and open-source software, but the binaries include trademarked artwork. The GNU Project attempts to keep IceCat in synchronization with upstream development of Firefox (long-term support versions) while removing all trademarked artwork and non-free add-ons. It also maintains a large list of free software plugins. In addition, it includes several security and privacy features not found in the mainline Firefox browser.

History

Origins of the name 
The Mozilla Corporation holds the trademark to the Firefox name and denies the use of the name "Firefox" to unofficial builds that fall outside certain guidelines. Unless distributions use the binary files supplied by Mozilla, fall within the stated guidelines, or else have special permission, they must compile the Firefox source with a compile-time option enabled that creates binaries without the official branding of Firefox and related artwork, using either the built-in free artwork, or artwork provided at compile time.

This policy led to a long debate within the Debian Project in 2004 and 2005. During this debate, the name "Iceweasel" was coined to refer to rebranded versions of Firefox. The first known use of the name in this context is by Nathanael Nerode, in reply to Eric Dorland's suggestion of "Icerabbit". It was intended as a parody of "Firefox". Iceweasel was subsequently used as the example name for a rebranded Firefox in the Mozilla Trademark Policy, and became the most commonly used name for a hypothetical rebranded version of Firefox. By January 1, 2005, rebranding was being referred to as the "Iceweasel route".

In August 2005, the GNUzilla project adopted the GNU IceWeasel name for a rebranded distribution of Firefox that made no references to nonfree plugins.

The term "ice weasel" appeared earlier in a line which cartoonist Matt Groening fictionally attributed to Friedrich Nietzsche: "Love is a snowmobile racing across the tundra and then suddenly it flips over, pinning you underneath. At night, the ice weasels come."

Debian was originally given permission to use the trademarks, and adopted the Firefox name. However, because the artwork in Firefox had a proprietary copyright license at the time, which was not compatible with the Debian Free Software Guidelines, the substituted logo had to remain. In 2006, Mozilla withdrew their permission for Debian to use the Firefox name due to significant changes to the browser that Mozilla deemed outside the boundaries of its policy, changes which Debian felt were important enough to keep, and Debian revived the Iceweasel name in its place.

Subsequently, on 23 September 2007, one of the developers of the GNU IceWeasel package announced that the name would be changed to GNU IceCat from IceWeasel in the next release, so as to avoid confusion with Debian's separately maintained, unrelated rebranding of Firefox. The name change took place as planned and IceCat is the current name.

IceCat was ported to the Firefox 3 codebase during Google Summer of Code of 2008.

Version history

Distribution 

GNU IceCat is freely downloadable for the IA-32, x86 64, and PowerPC architectures. Both binaries and source are available, though the current build is available only for Linux. Some distributions offer binary and source packages through their repositories, such as Trisquel, Parabola GNU/Linux-libre and Fedora.

IceCat is also available for macOS 10.4 and higher. Any Mac user with these versions of macOS can install IceCat through Fink.
For the Mac, it is available for both IA-32 and PowerPC architectures.

Unofficial builds are available for Windows (Vista or newer) and Android (2.3 or newer).

Additional security and privacy features 
IceCat includes additional security features, such as the option to block third party zero-length image files resulting in third-party cookies, also known as web bugs (This feature is available in Firefox 1.0, 1.5, and 3.0, but the UI option was absent on 2.0). GNU IceCat also provides warnings for URL redirection.

In version 3.0.2-g1, the certificate of a certificate authority CAcert.org has been added to the list of trusted root certificates. Concern about that decision has been raised in a discussion on the savannah-hackers-public mailing list.

The GNU LibreJS extension detects and blocks non-free non-trivial JavaScript.

IceCat also has functionality to set a different user agent string each for different domains in about:config. For example, setting a mobile user agent string for a desired DNS domain would make it possible to view the mobile version of a website on a desktop operating system.

Licensing 

Gnuzilla is available under the MPL/GPL/LGPL tri-license that Mozilla used for source code. Unlike Mozilla, IceCat's default icons are under the same tri-license.

See also 

 Comparison of web browsers
 History of Mozilla Firefox
 Mozilla software rebranded by Debian
 SeaMonkey, a more traditional continuation of Mozilla Suite

References

External links

 GNU.org, Homepage of Gnuzilla and IceCat

Mozilla
Free email software
Software forks
Free web browsers
Gecko-based software
IceCat
POSIX web browsers
Web browsers based on Firefox
Free and open-source Android software